Taurometopa aryrostrota is a moth in the family Crambidae. It was described by George Hampson in 1917. It is found in Sri Lanka.

The wingspan is about 16 mm. The forewings are golden yellow with five waved crimson red bands suffused with silvery purple. The hindwings are yellow, the apical area suffused with brown.

References

Moths described in 1917
Odontiinae